Thom Park is a public park in Gresham, Oregon.

External links
 
 Thom Park at the City of Gresham, Oregon

Gresham, Oregon
Municipal parks in Oregon